Christopher John Kibermanis (born March 24, 1976) is a Canadian former ice hockey player.

Born in Calgary, Alberta, Kibermanis, was drafted by the Winnipeg Jets in 1994. He played three seasons in the Western Hockey League with the Red Deer Rebels.

After his retirement from hockey, Kibermanis ran as an Alberta Liberal Party candidate during the 2004 Alberta provincial election, in the electoral district of Edmonton Castle Downs. On election night, he was initially declared elected by a margin of just five votes over incumbent Progressive Conservative Thomas Lukaszuk. Following a judicial recount, however, Lukaszuk was deemed to have won by three votes.

Kibermanis ran again in the 2008 election, but was again defeated by Lukaszuk, this time by 2,200 votes.

References

External links
 Chris Kibermanis website

Alberta Liberal Party candidates in Alberta provincial elections
Canadian people of Latvian descent
Red Deer Rebels players
Winnipeg Jets (1979–1996) draft picks
1976 births
Living people
Politicians from Calgary
Ice hockey people from Calgary
21st-century Canadian politicians
Canadian sportsperson-politicians
Canadian ice hockey defencemen